From Beyond is the fourth album by Swedish heavy metal band Enforcer was released on February 27, 2015 through Nuclear Blast.

Track listing

Personnel 
 Olof Wikstrandvocals, rhythm guitar, lead guitar
 Joseph Tholllead guitar
 Jonas Wikstranddrums
 Tobias Lindqvistbass

Chart performance

References

2015 albums
Enforcer (band) albums
Nuclear Blast albums